Desiderius of Vienne (died 607) was a martyred archbishop of Vienne and a chronicler.

Life 
Nothing is known about his early years. In 603, in a conflict with Brunhilda of Austrasia, the legitimacy of whose children he had attacked, he was deposed after she combined forces with Aridius, bishop of Lyon. He was stoned to death, some years later, at the order of King Theuderic II of Burgundy.

He was rebuked by Gregory the Great for his interest in the pagan classics, in a letter provoked by the schooling he was providing for his clergy.

Veneration 
He is venerated as a saint in the Catholic Church, with his feast days on May 26. In the Eastern Orthodox Church, his feast is celebrated on May 23 because of confusing him with Desiderius of Langres. A hagiographical work was written about him by the Visigothic king Sisebuto, during the 7th century. A later life was written by Ado of Vienne.

Notes

607 deaths
7th-century historians
7th-century Frankish bishops
7th-century Christian martyrs
Archbishops of Vienne
French chroniclers
7th-century Frankish saints
People executed by stoning
Year of birth unknown
7th-century Frankish writers
7th-century Latin writers
Year of birth uncertain
6th-century births
Bishops of Vienne